Whitehorse is the self-titled album from Whitehorse, a band consisting of Melissa McClelland and Luke Doucet. The album was released on August 30, 2011 in Canada by Six Shooter Records. It was made available for digital download on August 9, 2011.

Personnel
Melissa McClelland: vocals, acoustic guitar
Luke Doucet: vocals, White Falcon (and some other electric guitars), acoustic guitar, bass, pedal steel, piano, organ, banjo
Barry Mirochnick: drums, B3 bass and vocals on "Killing Time is Murder", drums on "Emerald Isle" and "Passenger 24"
Pat Steward: drums on "Broken" and "I'm On Fire"
Doug Elliott: bass on "Broken" and "I'm On Fire"

Track listing
"Eulogy for Whiskers, Part I"
"Killing Time is Murder"
"Emerald Isle"
"Passenger 24"
"Broken"
"I'm On Fire"
"Night Owls"
"Eulogy for Whiskers, Part II"

All songs written by Luke Doucet & Melissa McClellend, except "Broken" was written by Luke Doucet, Melissa McClellend & Sean MacDonald; and "I'm On Fire" was written by Bruce Springsteen

References

External links

 

2011 albums
Whitehorse (band) albums
Six Shooter Records albums